Rui Rosa (born 31 May 1962) is a Portuguese judoka. He competed in the men's half-lightweight event at the 1984 Summer Olympics.

References

1962 births
Living people
Portuguese male judoka
Olympic judoka of Portugal
Judoka at the 1984 Summer Olympics
Place of birth missing (living people)